In Celebration of Life is the second compilation album and seventh album overall by Greek keyboardist and composer Yanni, released on the Private Music label in 1991. Like its predecessor, Reflections of Passion, it consisted mostly of songs taken from Yanni's four previous albums. Unlike Reflections of Passion, it did not include any new material nor any songs from Yanni's debut album, Optimystique. However, it did include one song ("Song for Antarctica") taken from a multi-artist benefit album, Polar Shift.

The album peaked at #3 on Billboard'''s Top New Age Albums chart and at #60 on the Billboard 200 in the same year. The album was supported by the Revolution in Sound Tour.

 Track listing 

 Personnel 
All music produced by Peter Baumann & Yanni
All music composed by Yanni
Mastered by Bernie Grundman at Bernie Grundman Mastering. Los Angeles, CA
All music published by 23rd Street Publishing, Inc (ASCAP)
Management: Jeff D. Klein
Cover Photography by Kevin Mazur
Inside Photography by Lynn Goldsmith

Critical reception

In a review for AllMusic, Johnny Loftus called the album "a solid overview of the new age composer's initial work, displaying all of the tenets that have made his music so popular over the years." He concluded that "fans will have most, if not all of the material here, but newcomers might enjoy In Celebration of Life'' ."

Revolution in Sound Tour

Tour dates

The band
Charlie Adams – drums
Osama Afifi – bass guitar
Charlie Bisharat - violin
Karen Briggs - violin
Michael Bruno – percussion
Amy Shiotani – keyboards
Bradley Joseph – keyboards
Sachi McHenry – cello

Certifications

References

External links
Official Website

Yanni albums
1991 albums
Yanni concert tours